The 79th parallel south is a circle of latitude that is 79 degrees south of the Earth's equatorial plane in the Antarctic.

The parallel passes only through Antarctica and Antarctic ice shelves.

Around the world
Starting at the Prime Meridian and heading eastwards, the parallel 79° south passes through:

{| class="wikitable plainrowheaders"
! scope="col" width="125" | Co-ordinates
! scope="col" | Continent
! scope="col" | Notes
|-
| 
! scope="row" rowspan="12" | Antarctica
| Queen Maud Land, claimed by 
|-
| 
| Western Australian Antarctic Territory, claimed by 
|-
| 
| Adélie Land, claimed by 
|-
| 
| Eastern Australian Antarctic Territory, claimed by 
|-
| 
| Ross Dependency, claimed by 
|-
| 
| Marie Byrd Land, Unclaimed territory
|-
| 
| Antártica Chilena, claimed by 
|-
| 
|-
| 
|-
| 
|-
| 
| British Antarctic Territory, claimed by 
|-
| 
| Queen Maud Land, claimed by 
|}

See also
78th parallel south
80th parallel south

s79